León Félix Batista (born 1964) Dominican author and poet. On September 11, 2003, he conducted an atentado poético ("poetic attack") in New York City in remembrance of the WTC attacks  by flying a plane over New York  He represented the Dominican Republic at the Latin American Book Fair in December 2008 in Rome, Italy.

References

External links
León Felix Batista sobre su libro "Caducidad"

21st-century Dominican Republic poets
Dominican Republic male poets
1964 births
Living people